Tabuda is a genus of stiletto flies in the family Therevidae, with about seven described species.

Species
These seven species belong to the genus Tabuda:
 Tabuda borealis Cole, 1923 i c g
 Tabuda lyneborgi Webb & Irwin, 1999 c g
 Tabuda montana (Zaitzev, 1970) c g
 Tabuda planiceps (Loew, 1872) i c g b
 Tabuda superba (Frey, 1921) c g
 Tabuda varia (Walker, 1848) i c g b
 Tabuda zaitzevi Webb & Irwin, 1999 c g
Data sources: i = ITIS, c = Catalogue of Life, g = GBIF, b = Bugguide.net

References

Further reading

 

Therevidae
Articles created by Qbugbot
Asiloidea genera